Harris Eyre is an Australian neuroscientist, entrepreneur and author. He is focused on advancing the field of brain capital. He is a former Forbes 30 Under 30 Asia Listmaker and UCLA Fulbright Scholar.  In his work he incorporates insights from precision medicine, clinical care, entrepreneurship, convergence science, consumer participation, workforce development, economics, public policy  and diplomacy.

Eyre is a migraineur and recently wrote a short story titled "My migraines are a super power" for the European Federation of Neurological Associations.

Education 
Eyre grew up in Mackay, Queensland, Australia and completed his undergraduate medical degree (Bachelor of Medicine, Bachelor of Surgery (MBBS) with Honours) at James Cook University in North Queensland, Australia. His medical education specialized in rural, remote, Indigenous and tropical health. He then completed his PhD in neuroscience at the University of Adelaide. During his PhD, he was awarded the W.G. Walker Fulbright Scholarship to study at UCLA. The W.G. Walker Fulbright Scholarship is awarded to the top Australian Fulbright Scholar annually.

Career

Think tank
Eyre works with leading think tanks including the Center for Health and Biosciences at The Baker Institute for Public Policy at Rice University,  the Meadows Mental Health Policy Institute  and the Euro-Mediterranean Economists Association.

Industry 
Eyre has held a number of industry positions during his career.
He is currently president and chief medical officer of PRODEO, a group of brain health-focused executives. He is also co-founder of The PRODEO Institute, a think-tank focused on radically approaches to advancing brain health.

In 2015, Eyre was announced as Co-Founder and Chief Medical Officer of CNSdose, a company focused on personalized medication guidance. CNSdose is noted for incorporating blood-brain-barrier genetics into their tool and publishing a Randomized Controlled Trial. In 2016, the US Department of Veterans Affairs Health Administration noted CNSdose technology as "the most promising in an early field." CNSdose is a Texas Medical Center Venture Fund Portfolio Company. CNSdose completed the Melbourne Accelerator Program in 2016. When Eyre was Chief Medical Officer, the non-executive chairman was Hon Andrew Robb AO (former Trade and Investment Minister of Australia).. As Chief Medical Officer, Eyre worked in successful teams to secure a major commercial contract with Intermountain Healthcare  and independent funding for a large, multi-side RCT with Ramsay Health Care. While he was with CNSdose, he was heavily involved in scientific collaborations with global experts

Convergence mental health book 
Eyre is the lead editor of 'Convergence Mental Health: A Roadmap Towards Transdisciplinary Innovation' with Oxford University Press. The book description as outlined on the Oxford University Press website reads "Modern mental health issues are characterized by their complex, multi-systemic nature and broad societal impact, making them poorly suited to siloed approaches of thinking and innovation. Convergence science integrates knowledge, tools, and thought strategies from various fields and is the focal point where novel insights arise. Convergence Mental Health presents a blueprint for leveraging convergence science within the context of mental health in order to improve patient outcomes and health care systems."

This book includes contributions from organizations including the Milken Institute, APEC, OECD, Harvard University, Stanford University and the Mayo Clinic.

Notable chapter contributors include Julio Licinio, Vikram Patel and Reid Hoffman.

Notable quotes of support come from Jeff Cummings, John Arnold, Peter C Farrell, Victor Dzau and Ernestine Fu.

Brain capital
Eyre is leading the development of the Brain Capital Grand Strategy. This includes exploring and actioning Brain Capital in-all-policies, articulating and actioning the Brain Capital Investment Plan, and developing a Brain Capital Index. 

He co-leads the OECD Neuroscience-inspired Policy Initiative. This Initiative seeks to advance brain-based policy and investment innovations. On January 27, 2021, the OECD held a Brain Capital Event on this topic. Notable speakers included Angel Gurria (OECD Secretary General), Admiral William H McRaven, Thomas C Leppert, Megan Greene and Francesca Colombo. On March 26, 2021, the OECD held an event titled 'Innovations to Address Women’s Brain Health Inequalities'  Notable speakers included Juan Yermo (OECD Chief of Staff), Maureen Hackett, Antonella Santuccione, Sofia Noori, Sandra Bond Chapman and Megan Green. On June 10, 2021, the OECD held an event titled 'Rethinking Productivity: Insights from Neuroscience'. Notable speakers included George Vradenburg, Andy Keller, Husseini K Manji, Chiara Crisculo and Andrew S Nevin.

He leads the Brain Capital Alliance.  This is an expanded, multi-national and multi-organisational programme.

Brain capital has been profiled in the following policy innovation fora: 
 * United Nations General Assembly 2022  
 * FENS Forum 2022 
 * Congressional Neuroscience Caucus 2022 
 * US House Select Committee on Economic Disparity and Fairness in Growth 2022 
 * Lundbeck position statement on brain health 2022 
 * WHO position statement on brain health 2022 
 * Brookings Policy Paper proposing a White House Brain Capital Council 2021 
 * European Brain Initiative convening in 2021 
 * United Nations Development Programme Human Development Report 2022 
 * PwC

Academic 
Eyre published 140 + articles and chapters,.

In his research career, he has co-authored numerous works including the 'Brain Capital Grand Strategy', 'Brain Health Executive', ‘Responsible Innovation in Mental Health ’ model, 'Brain-based Stakeholder Capitalism', 'Brain Health Gap', 'Measurement-based Cognitive Care', ‘Mental Health Innovation Diplomacy’ model, the 'Brain Health Innovation Diplomacy' model, the 'Mars Mental Health' model, the 'Phase-specific Neuroimmune Model of Depression', a meta-analysis of chemokines in depression, a meta-analysis of pharmacogenetic-based decision support tools for depression, a randomized controlled trial of yoga to prevent dementia and the model of 'Convergence Psychiatry'.

He maintains advisory roles with Baylor College of Medicine, Brain Health Nexus at Cohen Veterans Bioscience, the Davos Alzheimer's Collaborative. and the Latin American Brain Health Institute.

Public and media appearances 
His academic work has been noted in The New York Times, the Financial Post, neo.life, STAT,  the Australian Financial Review, the 'Financial Times' and Les Echos.

Awards 
Eyre has been awarded various awards throughout his career including:
 2020 Innovation Award for the Australian American Chamber of Commerce
 2018 Forbes 30 Under 30 Asia Listing
 2015 W.G. Walker Fulbright Scholar
 2017 Victorian State Finalist for Young Australian of the Year
 2017 Outstanding Early Career Alumni Award for the College of Medicine and Dentistry at James Cook University
 2013 Junior Medical Officer of the Year, Australian Medical Association of Queensland

Works

Selected research articles 
 Build back brainier: base policies on brain science. A chapter in the OECD book Systemic Recovery. 
 Investing in Late Life Brain Capital. Innovations in Aging. 2022

References 

Living people
Year of birth missing (living people)
Australian neuroscientists
James Cook University alumni
University of Adelaide alumni